John Henry Clemenger (6 August 1891 – 19 July 1941) was an Australian rules footballer who played with Geelong in the Victorian Football League (VFL).

Notes

External links 

1891 births
1941 deaths
Australian rules footballers from Melbourne
Geelong Football Club players
Australian military personnel of World War I
People from Clifton Hill, Victoria
Military personnel from Melbourne